Schirgiswalde-Kirschau (Sorbian: Šěrachow-Korzym) is a town in the district of Bautzen, in Saxony, Germany. It was formed on January 1, 2011 by the merger of the former municipalities Schirgiswalde, Kirschau and Crostau.

References 

Populated places in Bautzen (district)